Ashtabula is a plantation house at 2725 Old Greenville Highway near Pendleton in Anderson County, South Carolina, USA. It has been also known as the Gibbes-Broyles-Latta-Pelzer House or some combination of one or more of these names. It was named in the National Register of Historic Places as a historic district on March 23, 1972. It is considered a significant example of a Lowcountry style plantation house built for a Charleston family in the Upstate in the early 19th century. It also is part of the Pendleton Historic District.

History

Around 1790, Thomas Lofton built a two-story, brick house at the site. Later, the Gassaway family owned the house, which they operated as a tavern on the stage road from Pendleton to Pickensville and Greenville.

In the mid-1820s, Lewis Ladson Gibbes from Charleston built the frame house now known as Ashtabula. His spouse was Maria Drayton of Drayton Hall and a niece of Arthur Middleton. She died in 1826 and he died in 1828 just before the completion of the house. Some of their children lived in the house.

It was sold to Dr. Ozey R. Broyles in 1837. Broyles had an interest in agricultural and invented a subsurface plow. In 1845, the plantation set the "world's record for rice" production of 110 bushels per acre with each bushel weighing . During this period, the average production in South Carolina was of the order of 40 bushels per acre.

In 1851, the plantation was sold to James Latta. He imported some of the first Hereford cattle from England to improve the cattle stock. At the beginning of the Civil War, Robert Adger of Charleston purchased the house for his daughter Clarissa and her husband O. A. Bowen. Clarissa kept a detailed diary of life on the plantation that was published in 1973.

Sarah E. Adger, daughter of Robert Adger, and her husband William D. Warner developed a dairy farm managed by a neighbor, J. C. Stribling. They brought the first Jersey cattle into South Carolina.

In 1880, Francis J. Pelzer, who built Pelzer Manufacturing Company, purchased the property. It was later owned by a number of South Carolinians. The last private owner was Frederick W. Symmes of Greenville. He owned it from 1940 to 1957.

It was then purchased by Mead Paper Company. They gave the house to the Foundation for the Historic  Restoration in the Pendleton Area in 1961. The Foundation's name was changed to the Pendleton Historic Foundation in the 1990s.

Ashtabula is now a house museum run by the Pendleton Historic Foundation. The house is furnished with antebellum furniture. It is open Tuesday through Friday and Sunday afternoons from April to October.

Architecture

The house is a two-story, nearly square, frame structure that is four bays wide. The house has a hip roof, two interior chimneys, and a widow's walk at the top. The house has two rooms on each side of a central hallway on each floor. The house has piazzas on three sides, supported by square columns. The front door has sidelights and a five-light transom. The windows are six over six light sash windows. The drawing room windows are French windows with panels below that open to the porch.

The interior walls are wide, horizontal planks covered with wallpaper. The central staircase has been moved back. Currently, there is a U-shaped staircase with a landing above the back entrance.

A passageway connects to the original brick house, which served as the kitchen and servants' quarters. This is the 1790 two-story brick building with a hip roof and central chimney.

References

External links

 Ashtabula Historical Marker
 
 

Houses on the National Register of Historic Places in South Carolina
Houses completed in 1828
Historic house museums in South Carolina
Plantation houses in South Carolina
Museums in Anderson County, South Carolina
National Register of Historic Places in Anderson County, South Carolina
Houses in Anderson County, South Carolina
Historic American Buildings Survey in South Carolina
Historic districts on the National Register of Historic Places in South Carolina
Individually listed contributing properties to historic districts on the National Register in South Carolina